Yeohlee Teng is an American fashion designer originally from Malaysia and of Chinese heritage. She received the Smithsonian's Cooper-Hewitt National Design Award for fashion design in 2004. Her work has been displayed at the Metropolitan Museum of Art, New York and Victoria & Albert, London.

Education
She hails from Penang where she attended St. George's Girls' School. She moved to New York in the 1970s to study fashion at the Parsons School of Design, New York.   She has worked primarily in New York City and established her own house, YEOHLEE inc in 1981.

Work
Yeohlee practices sustainable and universal design. She uses zero waste methods to create multi-functional garments.  Yeohlee believes that "clothes have magic." She dresses the "urban nomad", a term she coined for her Fall 1997 collection, defining a lifestyle that requires clothing that works on a variety of practical and psychological levels. She is a master of design management and believes in the efficiency of year-round, seasonless clothes.

Andrew Bolton, curator of the Costume Institute of the Metropolitan Museum of Art, stated that Yeohlee shares the vision of the Victoria and Albert Museum founders to both promote and further the use of newly developed processes within the field. On her views on decoration, Bolton stated that Yeohlee views ornament as intrinsic to their construction and as acceptable only when justified by construction, lending her dresses distinction and refinement while empowering the wearer and facilitating movement.

Yeohlee published YEOHLEE: WORK in 2003, which surveys the 20 years of her practice with essays by prominent fashion, art and design curators and critics.

Yeohlee spearheaded the Made in Midtown project as General Secretary on the board of the Council of Fashion Designers of America and in partnership with the Design Trust for Public Space and Making Midtown YEOHLEE’s collections are designed, developed and produced in New York’s Garment District. Today the store and workroom is located at 12 West 29th Street in the NoMad/ Flatiron District. Yeohlee Teng is on the board of the Municipal Art Society of New York.

Exhibitions
Her clothing designs have been creative and unusual right from the beginning of her career in the early 1980s. She believes that clothing is an intimate form of architecture. She has established her name for strong geometric designs and concise functualism.

Exhibitions of her designs have been held for more than 40 years now. Yeohlee's work, often described as "architectural," attracted the attention of critics and professionals in other fields of design. To an extent unusual for fashion designers, her clothes were exhibited as design art in many museums and galleries in the 1990s and early 2000s. Her participation in the group show Intimate Architecture: Contemporary Clothing Design, presented at the Hayden Gallery at the Massachusetts Institute of Technology in 1982, won a great deal of favorable attention for her work and was an important factor in the early success of her company. Quoted in the New York Times, designer Issey Miyake said Yeohlee's exhibit "proves that fashion no longer has to be separated from the other design fields. At its best, it is considerably more than a craft. It must represent its time. That M.I.T. has staged this show validates fashion and may inspire students here not to become electrical engineers but engineers of fashion.''
ultracontemporary, Phoenix Art Museum, October 27, 2018 - March 24, 2019
Fashion Unraveled, The Museum at FIT, May 25, 2018 - November 17, 2018
YEOHLEE | SERRA at Phoenix Art Museum, March 17, 2017 - May 29, 2017
Folk Couture: Fashion and Folk Art, American Folk Art Museum, January 21, 2014 - April 23, 2014
Front Row: Chinese American Designers, Museum of Chinese in America, April 26, 2013 - December 1, 2013
IMPACT: 50 Years of the CFDA, The Museum at FIT, February 10, 2012 - April 17, 2012
 Yield: Making Fashion Without Making Waste, The Dowse Art Museum, New Zealand, March 26, 2011 - June 26, 2011
 American Beauty: Aesthetics and Innovation in Fashion, The Museum at FIT, November 6, 2009 - April 10, 2010
YEOHLEE: Design For Now, Crow Collection of Asian Art, Dallas, TX, October 3, 2009 - January 3, 2010
Fashioning Felt, Cooper-Hewitt National Design Museum, New York, NY, March 6 - September 7, 2009
Breaking the Mode: Contemporary Fashion from the permanent collection, Los Angeles County Museum of Art, September 17, 2006 - January 7, 2007
blog.mode: addressing fashion, Costume Institute, Metropolitan Museum of Art, New York, NY, December 18, 2007 - April 13, 2008
Exoticism, The Museum at FIT, New York, NY, November 27, 2007 - May 7, 2008
Contromoda, Centre for Contemporary Arts at Palazzo Strozzi, Florence, Italy, October 12, 2007 - January 20, 2008
Luxury, The Museum at FIT, New York, NY, May 23 - November 10, 2007
SKIN+BONES: Parallel Practices in Fashion and Architecture, Somerset House, London, April 24, 2008 - August 10, 2008, Somerset House, London, April 24, 2008 - August 10, 2008; The National Art Center, Tokyo, June 6, 2007 - August 13, 2007; Museum of Contemporary Art (MOCA), Los Angeles, November 19, 2006 - March 5, 2007
THE FASHION OF ARCHITECTURE: Constructing the Architecture of Fashion, Center for Architecture, New York NY, January 11, 2006 - March 11, 2006
The New China Chic, Festival of China, The John F. Kennedy Center for the Performing Arts, Washington, DC, October 2005
YEOHLEE: SUPERMORDERN STYLE, The Museum at FIT, New York, NY, October 23, 2001 - January 5, 2002
YEOHLEE: Fashion in Motion, Victoria & Albert Museum, London, October 30 - December 4, 2000
The Super Modern Wardrobe, London College of Fashion, London, November 2 - December 6, 2000
Mutations//Mode 1960:2000, Palais Galliera, Paris, March 30 - July 31, 2000
China Chic: East Meets West, The Museum at FIT, New York, NY, February 16 - April 24, 1999
Energetics: Clothes and Enclosures, Aedes East Gallery, Berlin, May 22 - June 19, 1998 and the Netherlands Architecture Institute, Rotterdam, August 1 - September 6, 1999
Cubism and Fashion, Costume Institute, Metropolitan Museum of Art, New York, NY, December 10, 1998 - March 14, 1999
The New Couture, Museum of the City of New York, New York, NY, November 20, 1984 - June 16, 1985
Yeohlee Teng/ Fashion, MoMA PS1, New York, NY, January 22 - March 18, 1984
Intimate Architecture: Contemporary Clothing Design, Hayden Gallery, Massachusetts Institute of Technology, Cambridge, MA, May 15 - June 27, 1982

Press Coverage 

 "Yeohlee Fall 2021 Ready-to-Wear" - May 10, 2021, Vogue
"Yeohlee RTW Fall 2021" - April 30, 2021, WWD
"Amber Valletta & Fern Mallis Host Goodwill NYNJ Sustainable Fashion & COVID Fundraising Virtual Event 1/28" - January 28, 2021, Cision PR Newswire
 "Designers Pitching in With Goodwill NYNJ Virtual Event" - January 25, 2021, WWD
 "Jean Shafiroff: As You've Never Seen Her Before!" - November 6, 2020, Look Online
 "The Election Question: First Presidential Priority" - November 4, 2020, WWD
 "Yeohlee Spring 2021 Ready-to-Wear Collection" - October 7, 2020, Vogue.com
 "Yeohlee RTW Spring 2021" - September 30, 2020, WWD
 "10 Fashion Sustainability Initiatives to Know" - September 15, 2020, WWD
 "I LOVE NY: New York Fashion Moments From the Fairchild Archive"- September 14, 2020, WWD
 "The Asian-American Fashion Designers Who Shaped the Industry" - April 13, 2020, The New York Times
 "Yeohlee RTW Fall 2020" - February 13, 2020, WWD
 "Yeohlee RTW Spring 2020" - September 11, 2019, WWD
 "New York Spring 2020 Designer Inspirations: Part One" - September 4, 2019, WWD
 "Garment District Modernization Takes Step Closer to Fruition" - August 21, 2019, WWD
 "What Should Tom Ford's Top Priorities Be at the CFDA?" - March 20, 2019, WWD
 "Yeohlee RTW Fall 2019" - February 1, 2019, WWD
 "What Is the Current State of American Fashion?" - September 4, 2018, WWD
 "American Designer Yeohlee Teng on Why 'Clothes Have Magic'" - August 24, 2018, Luxury Daily
 "Yeohlee Resort 2019" - June 7, 2018, WWD
 "Where to Find Made in NYC Clothing and Accessories" - May 4, 2018, City Guide NY
 "The Fashion Industry Fights to Preserve Manhattan's Garment District" - May 2, 2017, Digiday
 "Phoenix Art Museum Unveils 'Yeohlee|Serra' Exhibition, Combining Fashion and Art" - March 17, 2017, WWD
 "Yeohlee, CF Goldman Display Versatile and Thoughtful Designs" - February 20, 2017, NY1
 "Yeohlee Teng to Team With Richard Serra for Phoenix Art Museum Installation" - February 14, 2017, WWD
 "Yeohlee Fall 2017 Runway" - February 14, 2017, The Fashion Spot
 "Anjelica Huston Wears Yeohlee at Vanity Fair Oscar Party" - February 28, 2016, WWD
 "New York Fashion Week Through the Years" - September 10, 2015, CHRON
 "A Studio Grounded in Her Beliefs" - September 22, 2010, The New York Times
 "Inside the Garment Center: Yeohlee Teng Takes Us to Regal Originals" - July 1, 2010, Fashionista
 "Needle and Thread Still Have a Home" - April 28, 2010, The New York Times

See also
 Chinese Americans in New York City

References

Sources
Chou, Jerome, ed. Making Midtown: A New Vision for a 21st Century Garment District in New York City. Design Trust for Public Space, 2012.

Khoo Salma Nasution, Alison Hayes & Sehra Yeap Zimbulis: Giving Our Best: The Story of St George's Girls' School, Penang, 1885-2010, Areca Books, 2010.

Major, John, ed. YEOHLEE : WORK. Australia: The Images Publishing Group Pty Ltd, 2003.

Sidlauskas, Susan, Intimate Architecture: Contemporary Clothing Design, Cambridge, MA: MIT, 1982.

External links
 Official site - 

 New York Times article - 
 Merge magazine profile - 
 The Laws of Style podcast hosted by Douglas Hand, March 27, 2019. 
 National Endowment for the Arts podcast, July 12, 2012
 Vogue Italia success stories
 Interview with David Rosen

American fashion designers of Chinese descent
American fashion designers
High fashion brands
Living people
People from Penang
Malaysian emigrants to the United States
Year of birth missing (living people)